Charles H. McCann Technical School is a technical school located in North Adams, Massachusetts, United States that serves grades 9-12. It serves the Northern Berkshire Vocational Regional School District made up of the City of North Adams, and the towns of Adams, Williamstown, Cheshire, Lanesborough, Clarksburg, Florida, Savoy, and Monroe, with tuition-based students coming from various other towns. In the high school, during the 2014-2015 school year, McCann had an enrollment of 500 students. McCann also provides a Post Secondary program.

History

1962 - McCann Tech was built at former boxer training site at 70 Hodges Cross Road in North Adams, Massachusetts and was an all-boys school until the 1970s.

1969 - "D Wing" constructed on southern side of school

2008 - $1M renovation of Gym/Locker Rooms

2009 - First Varsity boys' soccer team wins Massachusetts State Vocational Championship

2010 - First Varsity Football playoff appearance in school history.

2010 - McCann's Business Professionals of America(BPA) has a record 10 teams moving on to the national competition.

2014 - First Varsity Football Division 6 Western Massachusetts Championship

About McCann
McCann Technical School is one of the two high schools in North Adams, MA (Drury High School).

Academics include Math, English, History, Physical Education, Spanish, Business., and Science. In 2005, McCann began offering classes in Project Lead the Way, a comprehensive engineering program which prepares students in high tech fields. Students in this program create advanced projects that are viewed by professionals, and are able to earn as many as twelve college credits from the Rochester Institute of Technology.
In 2009-2010, around half the graduating student body pursued higher education at a two or four year college/university. The other half choose to either head into the workforce or go into the military.

McCann currently has nine technical majors for high school:
 Automotive
 Business Technology
 Carpentry/Cabinetry
 Computer Assisted Design (CAD)
 Culinary Arts
 Electricity
 Information Technology
 Machine Technology
 Metal Fabrication
In their junior and senior year, students also have the option to pursue employment in their major through the co-operative work program. Places of employment have included: Williams College, Crane & Co., and Morrison Berkshire.

Five postsecdonary programs are also offered:
 Cosmetology
 Medical Assisting
 Dental Assisting
 Practical Nursing (LPN)
 Surgical Technology

There are fifteen sports teams available during the school year (6 fall, 5 winter, and 4 spring). School athletic teams mainly compete against D-III and D-IV schools in Berkshire County and throughout Western Massachusetts, although, the football team is a D-VI program which plays mostly other D-VI schools in the Tri-County League where all teams except for McCann are from the Connecticut River Valley.

Enrollment

School Committee

In 1958 the Northern Berkshire Vocational Regional School District School Committee was formed for the first time in the history of the Commonwealth for a regional trade high school.  It was precedent setting and became the guide and model for other regional vocational school districts.  A vocational school amendment signed into law on June 29, 1959 (appended to Chap. 518) allowed the city of North Adams to join up to 14 area towns in forming a regional school district.  Normally the law permits only towns to join other towns for form regional school districts.  Originally there were nine communities interested in forming the regional school district, but only 7 decided to continue.  The district communities were North Adams, Adams, Clarksburg, Florida, Monroe, Savoy and Williamstown. The district revised its original agreement in 2012 adding the towns of Cheshire and Lanesborough.

The district committee has no official ties with municipal school committees and operates “like a separate municipality”.  Representation is based on population.

The Northern Berkshire Vocational Regional School District Committee hires the superintendent who is responsible for the district’s operations.

Notable alumni
Paul Babeau, sheriff of Pinal County, Arizona

References

External links
McCann Website
Football Website
Baseball Website

Buildings and structures in North Adams, Massachusetts
Schools in Berkshire County, Massachusetts
Public high schools in Massachusetts
1962 establishments in Massachusetts